The Nieuport 11 (or Nieuport XI C.1 in contemporary sources), nicknamed the Bébé, was a French World War I single seat sesquiplane fighter aircraft, designed by Gustave Delage. It was the primary aircraft that ended the Fokker Scourge in 1916. The type saw service with several of France's allies, and gave rise to the series of "vee-strut" Nieuport fighters that remained in service (latterly as trainers) into the 1920s.

Design and development

The Nieuport 11 was a scaled down development of the Nieuport 10, designed specifically as a single-seat fighter. Like the "10" the "11" was a sesquiplane, a biplane with a full-sized top wing with two spars, and a lower wing of much narrower chord and a single spar. Interplane struts in the form of a "Vee" joined the upper and lower wings. The sesquiplane layout reduced drag and improved the rate of climb, as well as offering a better view from the cockpit than either biplane or monoplane, while being substantially stronger than contemporary monoplanes. The narrow lower wing could experience aeroelastic flutter, but at air speeds beyond which the Nieuport 11 was capable, but would become an occasional problem on later much higher powered developments, as well as the German Albatros D.III.
Nieuport 11s were supplied to the French Aéronautique Militaire, the British Royal Naval Air Service, the Imperial Russian Air Service, the Belgian Air Force, and Italian Corpo Aeronautico Militare. 646 Nieuport 11s were produced by the Italian Macchi company under licence. 
After Romania suffered military setbacks, one Nieuport 11, and several Nieuport 12s were transferred from RNAS No.2 Wing as part of the Romanian Flight mission. Additional airplanes received were assembled at Rezerva generală a aviației, however the exact number of Nieuport 11s delivered is unknown.

Nieuport 16
In 1916 an improved version appeared as the Nieuport 16, which was a strengthened Nieuport 11 airframe powered by a  Le Rhône 9J rotary engine. Visible differences included a larger aperture in front of the "horse shoe" cowling and a headrest for the pilot. The Nieuport 16 was an interim type pending the delivery of the slightly larger Nieuport 17 C.1 whose design was begun in parallel with the 16, and remedied the 16's balance problems, as well as further improving performance.

Operational history

The Nieuport 11 reached the French front in January 1916, and 90 were in service within the month.

This small sesquiplane outclassed the Fokker Eindecker in every respect, including speed, climb rate and maneuverability. It featured ailerons for lateral control rather than the Fokker's wing warping, giving lighter, quicker roll response, and its elevator was attached to a conventional tail plane which provided better pitch control as opposed to the all-moving, balanced "Morane type" elevators of the Fokker.

The Fokker's sole remaining advantage was its synchronized machine gun, which fired forward through the arc of its propeller. At the time, the Allies lacked a similar system, and the Nieuport 11's Lewis machine gun was mounted to fire over the propeller, allowing uninterrupted forward fire. The Lewis was not synchronizable, due to its open bolt firing cycle design which resulted in an unpredictable rate of fire. Clearing gun jams and replacing ammunition drums in flight were challenging though, and the drums limited ammunition supply.

During the course of the Battle of Verdun in February 1916, the combination of the Nieuport 11s technical advantages and its concentration in dedicated fighter units allowed the French to establish air superiority, ending  the so-called "Fokker Scourge" and forcing radical changes in German tactics. The impact of the Nieuport was so dramatic that in mid to late 1916 several captured examples were repaired, rearmed with a synchronised "Spandau" gun, and flown at the front. Others were supplied by Idflieg to several manufacturers with the request that copies be built, and this had considerable influence on German fighter design.

Some Nieuport 11s and 16s were fitted to fire Le Prieur rockets from the struts for attacks on observation balloons and airships.

By March 1916 the Bébé was being replaced by both the Nieuport 16 and the much improved Nieuport 17, although Italian-built examples remained in first line service longer, as did Russian examples. Thereafter the Nieuport 11s continued to be used as trainers.

Variants
Nieuport 11 C.1
Single-seat fighter/scout biplane. Also known as the Nieuport Bébé or Nieuport Scout although these were used for any Nieuport fighter.
Nieuport-Macchi 11000 or 11.000
Variant built under licence in Italy with some detail modifications.
Nieuport 16 C.1
Improved version powered by a 110 hp (92 kW) Le Rhone 9J rotary piston engine.
B.Kh.1
Siamese designation for the Nieuport 11.

Operators
 
Aviation Militaire Belge
1ère Escadrille de Chasse
5me Escadrille de Chasse
6me Escadrille de Chasse
 
Aéronautique Militaire
Escadrille N.3
Escadrille N.12
Escadrille N.15
Escadrille N.23
Escadrille N.26
Escadrille N.31
Escadrille N.37
Escadrille N.38
Escadrille N.48
Escadrille N.49
Escadrille N.57
Escadrille N.65
Escadrille N.67
Escadrille N.68
Escadrille N.69
Escadrille N.73
Escadrille N.92
Escadrille N.102
Escadrille N.103
Escadrille N.112
Escadrille N.124
Escadrille N.387
Escadrille N.391

 
Corpo Aeronautico Militare - built under licence by Nieuport-Macchi
Supreme Command
70a Squadriglia
9th Gruppo (1 Armata)
71a Squadriglia
75a Squadriglia
78a Squadriglia
2nd Gruppo (2nd & 4th Armata)
76a Squadriglia
81a Squadriglia
85a Squadriglia (last Italian unit to operate Nieuport 11s, withdrawn 4 November 1918)
3rd gruppo72a Squadriglia7th Gruppo (6th & 1st Armata)79a Squadriglia10th Gruppo70a Squadriglia
78a Squadriglia
82a Squadriglia
91a SquadrigliaIndependent83a Squadriglia
85a Squadriglia
Sezione Nieuport

Luchtvaartafdeling (1 example captured, and 5 copies built by NV at Trompenburg)
 
Corpul Aerian Român - 1 Nieuport 11 was transferred from RNAS No.2 Wing in 1916. Total number of Nieuport 11s is unknown.Grupul 1 AeronauticEscadrila N.1Grupul 2 AeronauticEscadrila N.3
Escadrila N.11Grupul 3 Aeronautic'Escadrila N.10 
Imperial Russian Air Force - some built under licence by Dux

Royal Naval Air Service - operated 18 Nieuport 11s. The RFC did not operate the Nieuport 11.
No.1 Wing
No.2 Wing
No.4 Wing

Survivors and reproductions 
 the Musée de l'Air at le Bourget in Paris has the sole original surviving Nieuport 11, currently marked as N556 with the personal markings of Commandant Charles de Tricornot de Rose, holder of the first military pilot licence. It had previously been marked as N976.
 Old Rhinebeck Aerodrome has had a reproduction Bébé flying in many of their airshows in past years, last seen in Victor Chapman's colours, and powered with an original  Le Rhône 9C rotary engine, however it is currently being rebuilt following a crash.
 Vintage Aviator in New Zealand flies a Le Rhône-powered replica which was built in the United States which flies in the markings of Italian ace Alvaro Leonardi.

Specifications (Nieuport 11 C.1)

See also

References
 

Notes

Bibliography

 Chant, Christopher, and Michael J. H. Taylor. The World's Greatest Aircraft. Edison, NJ: Cartwell Books Inc., 2007. .

 Fitzsimons, Bernard, ed. The Illustrated Encyclopedia of the 20th Century Weapons and Warfare. London: Purnell & Sons Ltd., 1967/1969. .

 Janić Č., Petrović O., Short History of Aviation in Serbia'', Beograd, Aerokomunikacije, 2011. .

1910s French fighter aircraft
 011
Sesquiplanes
Aircraft first flown in 1915
Single-engined tractor aircraft
Rotary-engined aircraft